Marion Danne "Bill" Adair (February 10, 1913 – June 17, 2002) was an American coach and interim manager in Major League Baseball (MLB).

A second baseman, he was a career minor-league player who never rose about the Class AA level but who spent 21 years as a manager in the minors.

History
Born in Mobile, Alabama, Adair was a manager in the Braves organization (he managed farm clubs for all three cities the Braves played in), as well as the Detroit Tigers, San Diego Padres, Montreal Expos, and the Chicago White Sox organizations.

Adair was later a major league scout for the Philadelphia Phillies.

He compiled a 1,611-1,305 (.552) record in the minors, but his managing career in the major leagues was limited to ten games with the 1970 White Sox which was en route to a franchise-worst 56–106 finish. He had succeeded Don Gutteridge on an interim basis on September 2 with the team's record a major league-worst 49–87. His last game managing the White Sox was an 8–7 win over the Minnesota Twins at Metropolitan Stadium on September 13. He compiled a 4–6 (.400) record before Chuck Tanner took over two days later on September 15. Adair was not retained by Tanner beyond that season.

Adair also was a major league coach for the Braves (1962; 1967), White Sox (1970) and Expos (1976).

Managerial record

Death

He died in Bay Minette, Alabama at age 89 in 2002, survived by his wife, Olean, and three daughters.

Personal life
Adair enlisted in the United States Army in March 1943. He rose to the rank of technical sergeant and served in the European theatre.

See also
 Chicago White Sox all-time roster

References

1913 births
2002 deaths
Allentown Brooks players
Atlanta Braves coaches
Atlanta Crackers managers
Baseball coaches from Alabama
Bluefield Blue-Grays players
Chicago White Sox coaches
Chicago White Sox managers
Eau Claire Bears players
El Dorado Oilers players
Elmira Pioneers players
Hawaii Islanders managers
Jackson Mississippians players
Jackson Senators players
Knoxville Smokies players
Louisville Colonels (minor league) managers
Major League Baseball third base coaches
Memphis Chickasaws players
Milwaukee Braves coaches
Milwaukee Braves scouts
Montgomery Rebels players
Montreal Expos coaches
Montreal Expos scouts
Owensboro Oilers players
Panama City Fliers players
Philadelphia Phillies scouts
Rocky Mount Red Sox players
Sportspeople from Mobile, Alabama
Toronto Maple Leafs (International League) managers
Valdosta Tigers players
Winston-Salem Twins players
United States Army personnel of World War II
United States Army soldiers
American expatriate baseball people in Venezuela